Bad Behaviour is an Australian four-part television drama  miniseries on Stan streaming service. The series, based on the book of the same name by Rebecca Starford, is written by Pip Karmel and Magda Wozniak, directed by Corrie Chen, and produced by Amanda Higgs.

The series depicts the story of how the desire to belong sets in motion a cruel dynamic. It had its international premiere at 73rd Berlin International Film Festival in February 2023, and in Australia premiered on 17 February 2023 on Stan.

Synopsis
Joanne goes to an exclusive boarding school set in the bush called Silver Creek for a year on a scholarship. She tries to build relationships with fellow students in her dormitory, which is unsupervised at night as the teachers are located off campus. The school aims to build resilience by outdoor activities such as camping and marathons. 

Much of the story revolves around Jo's relationship with the dorm bully, Portia, and her repeated failure to support the only other scholarship girl, Alice.

Cast
 Jana McKinnon as Jo Mackenzie
 Markella Kavenagh as Portia
 Yerin Ha as Alice
 Erana James as Ronnie
 Dan Spielman as Keith Mackenzie
 Diana Glenn as Caroline Mackenzie
 Tuuli Narkle as Miss Lacey
 Mantshologane Maile as Ruby
 Melissa Kahraman as Briohny
 Daya Czepanski as Saskia
 Bronte Locke
 Abbey Morgan
 Malaynee Hayden
 Jessica Lu
 Nic Layton

Episodes

Production
The series, based on the book of the same name by Rebecca Starford, is written by Pip Karmel and Magda Wozniak, directed by Corrie Chen, and produced by Amanda Higgs. It is produced under the banner of Matchbox Pictures and funded by  Screen Australia.

Filming was wrapped up  on 24 March 2022 in Victoria.

Release 
The series had its international premiere at 73rd Berlin International Film Festival in Berlinale Series section on 20 February 2023. 

It premiered on 17 February 2023 on Stan.

References

External links
 
 

2023 Australian television series debuts
2020s Australian drama television series
Australian comedy-drama television series
2020s teen drama television series
English-language television shows
Television series about teenagers
Stan (service) original programming